James Cameron Mars Ferguson (born 20 February 1935) is a Scottish former footballer who played in the Scottish Football League for Dundee, Falkirk and Stenhousemuir, and in the English Football League for Oldham Athletic, Crewe Alexandra and Darlington. He played as a goalkeeper. While on National Service in 1957, Ferguson played for a Scottish-based Combined Services XI.

References

1935 births
Living people
Footballers from Glasgow
Scottish footballers
Association football goalkeepers
Renfrew F.C. players
Dundee F.C. players
Falkirk F.C. players
Oldham Athletic A.F.C. players
Crewe Alexandra F.C. players
Darlington F.C. players
Stenhousemuir F.C. players
Scottish Football League players
English Football League players